Maka Yusota (Boiling Springs) is a sacred site revered by the Dakota people, located in Savage, Minnesota, United States. The location features a pool of water over an artesian well that remains liquid year-round. A thick layer of fine sand sits on the bottom of the pool, which traps the spring water and releases it in bursts, creating an illusion of boiling water.

References

Dakota
Geography of Scott County, Minnesota
National Register of Historic Places in Scott County, Minnesota
Native American history of Minnesota
Natural features on the National Register of Historic Places in Minnesota
Properties of religious function on the National Register of Historic Places in Minnesota
Religious places of the indigenous peoples of North America
Springs of Minnesota